The men's 10,000 metres at the 1934 European Athletics Championships was held in Turin, Italy, at the  Stadio Benito Mussolini on 7 September 1934.

Medalists

Results

Final
7 September

Participation
According to an unofficial count, 9 athletes from 7 countries participated in the event.

 (1)
 (1)
 (2)
 (1)
 (1)
 (2)
 (1)

References

10000
10,000 metres at the European Athletics Championships